The modern constellation Centaurus lies across two of the quadrants symbolized by the Azure Dragon of the East (東方青龍, Dōng Fāng Qīng Lóng), the Vermillion Bird of the South (南方朱雀, Nán Fāng Zhū Què), and the Southern Asterisms (近南極星區, Jìnnánjíxīngōu).

According to the quadrant, Centaurus is possibly not fully visible in the Chinese sky. Hadar (Beta Centauri) is a bright star in this constellation that is possibly never seen in Chinese sky.

The name of the western constellation in modern Chinese is 半人馬座 (bàn rén mǎ zuò), meaning "the centaur constellation".

Stars
The map of Chinese constellation in constellation Centaurus area consists of:

See also
Traditional Chinese star names
Chinese constellations
List of brightest stars

References

External links
Centaurus – Chinese associations
 香港太空館研究資源
 中國星區、星官及星名英譯表
 天象文學
 台灣自然科學博物館天文教育資訊網
 中國古天文
 中國古代的星象系統

Astronomy in China
Centaurus (constellation)